, was a kugyō or Japanese court noble and classic scholar of the Muromachi period (1336–1573).

Kujō Tanemichi held a regent position (kampaku) from 1533 to 1534. The calligrapher and poet, Ono Otsu, was one of his students. Kanetaka was his adopted son.

Family
 Father: Kujō Hisatsune
 Mother: Sanjōnishi Yasuko
 Wife: unknown
 child: daughter
 adopted son: Kujō Kanetaka

References
Sources
 
Notes

1507 births
1594 deaths
Fujiwara clan
Kujō family